Musical Varieties is a 1948 Pictorial Films musical short film starring Rosemary Lane and Johnny Downs.

Plot summary 
Farm workers harvest the crop whilst singing. At night they meet at the barn dance for more singing and dancing. Later, a man and a woman declare their love for each other, that "you could have knocked me over with a feather". The pair's song number is imitated by a male trio, one impersonating the woman.

Cast 
 Rosemary Lane
 Johnny Downs
 Radio Rogues
 Eddie Le Baron's Orchestra

External links 

1948 films
1948 musical films
American black-and-white films
American musical films
1940s English-language films
1940s American films